Alfred Vanoide Fletcher (August 6, 1924 – March 17, 2010) was an American professional baseball player. The right-handed pitcher appeared in nine games for the Detroit Tigers of Major League Baseball in 1955.

Fletcher was born in East Bend, North Carolina, in 1924. He volunteered for service in the United States Army and fought in World War II in the European Theater of Operations. Following the completion of his military service, Fletcher was signed by the St. Louis Cardinals' organization. Beginning in 1949, he played for several minor league baseball teams, including the Elkin Blanketeers, Vancouver Capilanos, and Seattle Rainiers. In August 1954, the Detroit Tigers acquired him from the Rainiers.

In nine games (all in relief during the opening six weeks of the 1955 season) and 12 full innings pitched, he allowed 13 hits, two bases on balls, and ten runs—but only four were earned. He struck out four.  He did not record a decision.

After spending the 1957 season with the Birmingham Barons, Fletcher retired from baseball. He returned to Yadkin County where he worked as a building contractor in the Winston-Salem and Yadkinville areas. He also farmed tobacco for many years as well as coaching little league baseball throughout the 1960s and 1970s. Fletcher died in Yadkinville on March 17, 2010, at the age of 85. He was survived by his widow, the former Rilla Whitaker, as well as his two sons.

References

External links

Retrosheet – major league statistics
Obituary

1924 births
2010 deaths
Amarillo Gold Sox players
Baseball players from North Carolina
Birmingham Barons players
Buffalo Bisons (minor league) players
Charleston Senators players
Detroit Tigers players
Elkin Blanketeers players
Little Rock Travelers players
Major League Baseball pitchers
Montgomery Rebels players
People from East Bend, North Carolina
Seattle Rainiers players
Tyler Trojans players
United States Army personnel of World War II
Vancouver Capilanos players